Matthew Patrick LaFleur (born November 3, 1979) is an American football coach who is the head coach for the Green Bay Packers of the National Football League (NFL). He has served as the quarterback coach of the Washington Redskins, Notre Dame, and the Atlanta Falcons and has been the offensive coordinator for the Los Angeles Rams and the Tennessee Titans.

Playing career
Born and raised in Mount Pleasant, Michigan, LaFleur attended Western Michigan University in Kalamazoo and played wide receiver in 1998 and 1999.  to Saginaw Valley State in Division II, and he played quarterback from 2000 to 2002, guiding the Cardinals to the D-II playoffs  LaFleur left Saginaw Valley State as their all-time leader in passing yards, completions, and passing touchdowns. LaFleur was inducted into the SVSU Cardinal Athletic Hall of Fame on October 1, 2021.

LaFleur briefly played professionally in the National Indoor Football League with the Omaha Beef as the backup quarterback in 2003 and, the following summer, signed with the Billings Outlaws.

Coaching career

Early years
LaFleur's coaching career began in 2003 at his alma mater, Saginaw Valley State, as an offensive graduate assistant, during which time he also substitute taught in the local high schools, specializing in math. LaFleur proceeded to Central Michigan University in Mount Pleasant and assisted the offensive staff in 2004 and 2005. In 2006, he coached quarterbacks and receivers at Northern Michigan University in Marquette. LaFleur was the offensive coordinator at Ashland University in Ohio in 2007.

Houston Texans
LaFleur then was hired in 2008 by the Houston Texans to serve as an offensive assistant. He assisted both wide receivers and quarterbacks during his two-year stint there and developed a close relationship with offensive coordinator Kyle Shanahan.

Washington Redskins
When Shanahan's father Mike was hired by the Washington Redskins, Kyle brought LaFleur to Washington to coach the quarterbacks in 2010. From 2011 to 2013, LaFleur worked alongside 3 other future head coaches in Washington; Kyle Shanahan, Sean McVay, and Mike McDaniel. A primary responsibility of LaFleur's for the 2012 season was to mentor rookie quarterbacks Robert Griffin III and Kirk Cousins.

Notre Dame
After six years of coaching in the NFL, LaFleur returned to college football as the quarterbacks coach at the University of Notre Dame in 2014. LaFleur tutored senior quarterback Everett Golson who posted 3,445 yards and 29 touchdowns through the air, helping him become just the fourth quarterback in school history to eclipse such totals in a single season.

Atlanta Falcons

On February 5, 2015, LaFleur returned to the NFL as the quarterbacks coach for the Atlanta Falcons working under offensive coordinator Kyle Shanahan, with whom he had previously worked with while with the Washington Redskins and Houston Texans. LaFleur's younger brother, Mike, was also an offensive assistant with the Falcons.

In 2016, LaFleur coached Matt Ryan on his way to winning his sole NFL MVP award. The Falcons reached Super Bowl LI, where they faced the New England Patriots, but squandered a large lead and lost  in overtime.

Los Angeles Rams
On February 8, 2017, LaFleur joined the Los Angeles Rams coaching staff as offensive coordinator, working under head coach Sean McVay, with whom he had previously worked during his tenure with the Washington Redskins. Under LaFleur and McVay, the Rams finished the year with an 11–5 record and as the league's number one scoring offense, scoring 478 points through 16 games.

Tennessee Titans
On January 30, 2018, LaFleur left his position with the Rams to take the same position with the Tennessee Titans. Joining new head coach Mike Vrabel, LaFleur's role in directing the offense increased, as he had play-calling responsibilities unlike during his tenure with the Rams. The season was plagued with injuries, with the Titans losing star tight end Delanie Walker in Week 1, and Mariota dealing with an incessant nerve injury throughout the season. LaFleur and the Titans finished the season with the 27th ranked scoring offense in the NFL.

Green Bay Packers
LaFleur was hired as the head coach of the Green Bay Packers on  On May 30, 2019, LaFleur suffered a torn Achilles while playing basketball. LaFleur also led the Packers to a 2–2 preseason.

2019 season
On September 5, 2019, LaFleur made his regular-season head coaching debut against the Chicago Bears, and led the Packers to a 10–3 victory. He also became the first Green Bay coach to win his first game against the Bears since Vince Lombardi in 1959. The Packers finished with a 13–3 record in LaFleur's first season as a head coach, and in the process, LaFleur became the first Packers rookie head coach to win 10 games, make the playoffs, and win the NFC North (as well as going 6–0 in division play in the process). In addition, the 13 wins were the most from a rookie coach since Jim Harbaugh did it with the 49ers in 2011. 

LaFleur led Green Bay to their first postseason berth since the 2016 season as the NFC's number two seed, as he won his postseason debut against the Seattle Seahawks 28–23 in the divisional round of the playoffs to advance to the NFC Championship Game, where the Packers fell to the top-seeded San Francisco 49ers 37–20.

2020 season 
The Packers began the 2020 season by winning all four games prior to an early Week 5 bye. After a 5–1 start, LaFleur lost his first-ever divisional game, with a 22–28 home loss to the Minnesota Vikings. Despite this, the Packers continued rolling, and LaFleur clinched his second consecutive NFC North title and playoff berth in Week 14 with a 31–24 victory against the Detroit Lions. With a 35–16 win over the Chicago Bears in Week 17, Green Bay clinched the NFC's number one seed and home-field advantage throughout the playoffs for the first time since the 2011 season. The Packers also closed the season out on a six-game winning streak, and LaFleur extended his win–loss record in December games to 9–0. 

LaFleur finished with a 26–6 record in his first two seasons as coach, tied for the second-best start for a coach since the 1970 merger (only George Seifert, at 28–4, has a better record). His team finished as the league's number one offense, scoring 509 points over the course of the season, and with quarterback Aaron Rodgers throwing for a Packers franchise-record 48 touchdowns.

In the playoffs, LaFleur and the Packers hosted the Los Angeles Rams, who had the league's number one scoring defense and were led by one of LaFleur's former bosses, Rams coach Sean McVay. The Packers defeated the Rams, 32–18, to host the NFC Championship Game for the first time since 2007, where they lost to the eventual Super Bowl champion Tampa Bay Buccaneers, 31–26. LaFleur was criticized for his decision to kick a field goal when the Packers were down 31-23 instead of trying to tie the game with a touchdown and a two point conversion under league MVP Aaron Rodgers.

2021 season
LaFleur's 2021 season began with a 38–3 loss to the New Orleans Saints. They proceeded to win each of their next six games to bring the 6–1 Packers to a Thursday night showdown with the NFL's last unbeaten team, the 7–0 Arizona Cardinals. In addition to playing on the road on a short week, the Packers were forced to play without their top three wide receivers, after Davante Adams and Allen Lazard tested positive for COVID-19 and Marquez Valdes-Scantling remained out with a hamstring injury since Week 3. Despite the challenges, the Packers emerged victorious, 24–21 with a thrilling last-minute interception of Cardinals quarterback Kyler Murray, and LaFleur became the winningest head coach through his first 40 career games in NFL history.

The following week, star quarterback Aaron Rodgers tested positive for COVID-19, and LaFleur named second-year quarterback Jordan Love the starter for their Week 9 game against the Kansas City Chiefs. Although Love was relentlessly blitzed during his first career start, he managed to complete 19 of 34 passes for 190 yards, 1 touchdown and 1 interception. LaFleur took the blame for not being able to counter the Chiefs' aggressive defensive strategies. Special teams miscues ultimately cost the Packers the game, falling 7–13 to drop them to 7–2.

The Packers then shut out Seattle Seahawks quarterback Russell Wilson the following week, the first such occurrence in his career, to win their Week 10 game 17–0. In Week 11, LaFleur's Packers fell 31–34 to their division rival Minnesota Vikings, but rebounded to win 36–28 against LaFleur's former boss Sean McVay and the Los Angeles Rams the following week. The Packers clinched their third consecutive NFC North title with a tight 31–30 Week 15 victory over the Baltimore Ravens. LaFleur became the first head coach since Dallas's Barry Switzer to win the division in each of his first three years as head coach. 

With a 37–10 Week 17 victory over the Minnesota Vikings, LaFleur's Packers clinched home-field advantage throughout the NFC playoffs and became the first team in NFL history to win 13 games a season in 3 consecutive years. In addition, LaFleur broke a 30-year-old record by George Seifert for the most wins by a head coach (39) through his first 3 seasons in the league. The win also meant to this point in his career, LaFleur had never lost consecutive regular season games during his 3-year tenure.

The Packers dealt with a notable amount of injuries throughout the season. Top pass-rusher Za'Darius Smith had not played since Week 1, while top cornerback Jaire Alexander had been out since spraining his shoulder in Week 4. Top tackle David Bakhtiari tore his ACL during the 2020 season, and didn't return until Week 18. His replacement, offensive lineman Elgton Jenkins, was lost for the season with a similar ACL injury in Week 11. In addition, starting tight end Robert Tonyan met a similar fate during the Packers' Week 8 showdown in Arizona.

At the end of the regular season, quarterback Aaron Rodgers was named NFL MVP for the second consecutive year and for the fourth time in his career. Rodgers noted LaFleur's contributions to his winning MVP in 2 of LaFleur's 3 seasons as head coach. Rodgers became the first player in the NFL to win consecutive MVP awards in 12 years, when Peyton Manning won in 2008 and 2009. In the playoffs, they lost their first game to the San Francisco 49ers, 13–10, giving LaFleur a 2–3 postseason record and no Super Bowl appearances in their three straight 13-win seasons. He took the blame for the Packers’ poor special teams effort, particularly one play where they were missing a man on the field during San Francisco's game-winning field goal.

2022 season
LaFleur's 2022 season as head coach began with another opening day loss this time to the  Minnesota Vikings. The Packers would go on to win 3 straight, however, after the 3-1 start the season started to fall apart. In their next 8 games they would just go 1-7, making their record on the year 4-8.

The Packers won their next 4 games in a row to get back to a .500 record, setting up a matchup with the  Detroit Lions at home with a playoff berth on the line. The Packers would ultimately lose 20-16, finishing with an 8-9 record and giving Matt LaFleur his first losing season as head coach, as well as his first missing the playoffs.

Head coaching record

Personal life
LaFleur is married to BreAnne Maak, whom he met in college, and they have two sons, Luke and Ty. His younger brother, Mike, most recently was the offensive coordinator for the New York Jets. Robert Saleh was the best man at LaFleur's wedding, as the two became close while working as graduate assistants at Central Michigan.

References

External links

Green Bay Packers bio

1979 births
Living people
American football quarterbacks
American football wide receivers 
Atlanta Falcons coaches
Ashland Eagles football coaches
Billings Outlaws players
Central Michigan Chippewas football coaches
Green Bay Packers head coaches
Houston Texans coaches
Los Angeles Rams coaches
Northern Michigan Wildcats football coaches
Notre Dame Fighting Irish football coaches
Omaha Beef players
People from Mount Pleasant, Michigan
Players of American football from Michigan
Saginaw Valley State Cardinals football coaches
Saginaw Valley State Cardinals football players
Washington Redskins coaches
Western Michigan Broncos football players
National Football League offensive coordinators
American people of French descent